is a 1956 romantic fantasy film directed by Shirō Toyoda. The film is based on the Chinese fairy tale Pai-she Chuan and the stories Story of a White Snake and White Woman's Magic by Fusao Hayashi.

Plot 

During the Song dynasty, in the hamlet of Hangzhou, Xu Xian is paying his respects to the dead. While traveling on a ferry, he meets Xiao-qing and her mistress, Bai-niang, of the house of Bai. As they introduce themselves, Bai-niang's red scarf flies into Xu Xian's face. Xian gives the scarf back and lends his parasol to the two ladies to protect them from the sudden rainstorm. The next day, he goes to the Bai manor to retrieve his parasol. Xu Xian reveals he has no status and is the apprentice of his brother's medicine shop. To help him, Bai-niang gives him 500 pieces of silver and her red scarf as proof of her love. Xian goes home and gives the silver to his family. Unbeknownst to him, Xiao-qing stole the silver from the local treasury on behalf of her mistress for him. His brother, realizing the truth, turns in the silver. At the behest of the government and his family, Xu Xian takes everyone to the Bai manor, which is abandoned and does not appear lived in. The officials and soldiers go in the manor, and in her room, see Bai-niang, who disappears in a cloud of smoke.

Xu Xian is sent to Suzhou to serve time under an innkeeper/money lender named Wang Ming. While working in the inn, Bai-niang and Xiao-qing appear to him, as guests. Xiao-qing coaxes Xu Xian to see his mistress who, once again declares her love to the young man. Xu-Xian and Bai-niang consummate their relationship.

Winter and Spring pass, and the local Luzu festival is underway. Wang Ming lends the Xian family money and decides he wants it back. Xu Xian escapes while Bai-niang distracts him. Wang Ming intends on seducing her until Xiao-qing intercedes on her behalf. When Wang Ming turns around, Bai-niang is gone. Xu Xian attends the festival and there meets a Taoist monk from Mount Ji, who makes it his life's mission to save Xian from his "misery." According to him, Xian is bewitched and gives him three talismans to place on his body, his bedroom door, and into a flame, to save his humanity. When Xian tries to escape him, the monk surrounds him with a flame wall.

Xiao-qing is witness to the monk's intercession and informs Bai-niang, who gives her instructions for the evening, Xiao-qing is to poison the local waters, and the Xian family will make a medicine to cure the sickness. Xiao-qing questions her mistress, wondering if harming the people would be bad in Heaven's eyes, but Bai-niang brushes her off, stating that what matters to her is Xian's happiness. At midnight, Xiao-qing sneaks off to do as her mistress wishes and the monk appears at their home to magically force Xu Xian to use the talismans. Xian awakens and is about to burn the last one when Bai-niang awakens. After learning what has happened, Bai-niang guilts Xian and takes the talisman and burns it. The talisman's power reverses and paralyzes the monk.

The next day, the villagers go to the Xians' shop and buy up their medicine to pay off Wang. While the shop is busy, Bai-niang confronts the monk, and after a show of magic powers, Bai-niang traps the monk on top of a temple steeple, admonishing and belittling his magical power. To celebrate the success of their medicine, Wang invites Xian and the two ladies to his manor to celebrate. Xiao-qing points out that Wang intends to inebriate Bai-niang to sleep with her, and reminds Bai-niang that Realgar wine is poisonous to them.

Xu Xian, Bai-niang, and Xiao-qing go to the Wang home, and after revelry, Xiao-qing tries to remind her mistress about the wine but has an accident with a maid, who splashes the wine on her. Xiao-qing screams and runs into the Wang garden. Out of eyesight, the young woman transforms into a small green snake. In their drunken stupor, the two men force Bai-niang to drink the wine. She becomes severely ill from the wine and passes out. Wang has the madam put into a guest room to recover. Xu Xian checks on his wife, who has transformed into a white snake. He dies from fright while a green cloud pours out of the room.

Bai-niang goes to Heaven and begs the King of the Heavens to give her a stalk of magical grass to heal Xu Xian, but he refuses, citing her actions as evil and intends to imprison her in Heaven for her deeds. The Bodhisattva intercedes on her behalf, having pity on her, and she declares to give up her power for Xian's love.

The Taoist monk prays over Xian's body, and when he wakes up, the monk takes credit for Xian's revival. When Xiao-qing tries to tell her master the truth, The Taoist monk rebuffs her, causing Xu Xian to curse Bai-niang and they both go off to the Gold Mountain temple. Bai-niang returns and learns about what happens. She cries in despondence, which angers Xiao-qing. Xiao-qing admonishes her mistress and reminds her mistress that they have strong power.

Xu Xian is pardoned by the high monk, telling him he can go home to Hangzhou. Both women go to the temple and talk to the high monk who refuses to hand over Xian, saying he wishes to be left alone. Realizing that they need to show their power, Xiao-qing and Bai-niang cast a spell that floods the temple with water caused by a typhoon in the nearby lake. The Taoist monk who caused the problem realizes that Bai-niang has the magic and blessing of the seven Dragon kings, and is very powerful. Bai-niang chants and casts the spell, and only stops when she realizes that Xu Xian is about to drown. Xiao-qing slaps her mistress and tries to get her to continue the spell, knowing that if she stops, it will reflect on the two women. She stops anyhow, causing them to be deluged in water. In fury, Xiao-qing curses Bai-niang and abandons her at the edge of the lake.

Xu Xian goes home, and on his path home, he sees illusions of a ghost Bai-niang and a white snake. Realizing his folly, he runs through a dark and despondent wood leading to the gate of Heaven. The high monk of the Gold Mountain temple asks him why does he surrender to Bai-niang. Xian realized that he loved her and she would do anything for him. The monk reminds him that she is a white snake. Xian contemplates that some human women have the hearts of snakes, and decides to follow her into Heaven, dying alongside his wife, with both him and Bai-niang floating up to Heaven.

Cast 
 Ryō Ikebe as Xu Xian, the young man
 Shirley Yamaguchi as Bai Niang (Madame White Snake)
 Kaoru Yachigusa as Xiao-Qing. Bai-niang's servant, a green snake
 Musei Tokugawa as the selfish Taoist monk
 Kichijiro Ueda as Wang Ming, the moneylender
 Nijiko Kiyokawa
 Haruo Tanaka
 Eijirō Tōno
 Yoshio Kosugi as leader of the guard
 Akira Tani
 Ikio Sawamura as a guardsman
 Bokuzen Hidari

Release
The Legend of the White Serpent was distributed theatrically in Japan as Byaku fujin no yoren, where it received a roadshow theatrical release on 22 June 1956. The film was released in Hong Kong as Pai-she Chuan in 1956. The film was released in the United States as Madame White Snake by Toho International with English language subtitles in 1965.

Reception
Mitsuo Miura won the award for Best Cinematography at the Mainichi Film Concours for the work done in The Legend of the White Serpent and Shozo, a Cat, and Two Women. At the 6th Berlin International Film Festival, it won the Honourable Mention (Colour) award.

See also 
 The Tale of the White Serpent, a 1958 anime film

References

Footnotes

Sources

External links 
 

1950s fantasy films
1956 films
Films based on the Legend of the White Snake
Films directed by Shirō Toyoda
Films produced by Tomoyuki Tanaka
Hong Kong romantic fantasy films
Shaw Brothers Studio films
Toho films
Japanese romantic fantasy films